Kozaklı, formerly Hamamorta, is a town and district of Nevşehir Province in the Central Anatolia region of Turkey. According to 2010 census, population of the district is 15,519 of which 7,011 live in the town of Kozaklı.

Located in Cappadocia, Kozaklı is one of the district centers of Nevşehir. Due to its central situation to the nearest larger cities like Nevşehir, Kayseri, Yozgat, Niğde and Kırşehir (within  distance), and particularly due to its natural spas, hamams and hotel facilities, Kozaklı has been a popular resort in Central Anatolia.

Neighbourhoods
The town of Kozaklı consists of the following quarters: Buruncuk Mahallesi, Hocaahmet Yesevi Mahallesi, Kızılkoyunlu Mahalle, Yabanlı Mahalle, Altınsu Mahallesi, Bağlıca Mahallesi, Bahçelievler Mahallesi, Hamamorta Mahallesi and Yeni Mahalle.

Villages
Kozaklı province is divided into 35 districts (capital district in bold):
Abdi
Aylı
Belekli
Büyükyağlı
Cağşak
Çayiçi
Doyduk
Dörtyol
Gerce
Hacıfakılı
İmran
Boğaziçi
Kapaklı
Kaşkışla
Kuruağıl
Küçükyağlı
Merdanali
Taşlıhöyük
Hızıruşağı

Özce
Yassıca

Notes and references

External links

 KOZTEB
 District governor's official website 
 District municipality's official website 
 District municipality's official website 
 [ Map of Kozaklı district] 
 Administrative map of Kozaklı district 

Towns in Turkey
Districts of Nevşehir Province
Cappadocia
Populated places in Nevşehir Province